Davidstow Cheddar is a brand of Cheddar cheese manufactured by Dairy Crest, at the Davidstow Creamery in Cornwall, England, United Kingdom, alongside Cathedral City Cheddar.

Production
Cheddar has been produced at Davidstow for over 60 years, the plant being set up there in 1951 by Cow & Gate. Milk is supplied by 300 farms in Cornwall and Devon, all within a 50-mile radius. The Davidstow plant is the largest in Britain, having been upgraded in 2004, and has the capacity to produce 1,000 tonnes of Davidstow and Cathedral City cheese per week.

Awards
Davidstow won Gold trophies  at the International Cheese Awards in Nantwich in 2010 and 2011. Rick Stein has put his name to a brand of savoury oat biscuits with Davidstow cheddar cheese. and Davidstow cheddar is used by Nathan Outlaw in his two Michelin star restaurant.

References

External links

Davidstow Cheddar website

Cornish cheeses
Cow's-milk cheeses